San Gabriel (Spanish for "St. Gabriel") is a city located in the San Gabriel Valley of Los Angeles County, California. At the 2010 census, the population was 39,718.

San Gabriel was founded by the Spanish in 1771, when Mission San Gabriel Arcángel was established by Saint Junípero Serra. Through the Spanish and Mexican periods, San Gabriel played an important role in the development of Los Angeles and Californio society. Owing to the prominence of Mission San Gabriel in the region's history, it is often called the "birthplace of the Los Angeles region".

History

Prior to the arrival of the Spanish to Alta California, the area that is now San Gabriel was inhabited by the Tongva , whom the Spanish called the Gabrieleño. The Tongva name for the San Gabriel region has been reconstructed as Shevaa. The village of Toviscanga was located at the site where Mission San Gabriel would be constructed.

Spanish period
Mission San Gabriel Arcángel, founded by Father Junípero Serra in 1771, is the fourth of twenty-one California Missions, and is known as the "Pride of the California Missions."

Mexican period
The Mission San Gabriel Arcángel served a pivotal role in the Californio society, with many of the area's first Mexican settlers being baptized at the mission, including future governor Pio Pico, who was born in 1801 at the mission and baptized there the same year. He was appointed as California's governor twice, serving briefly in 1832 and again from 1845 through the Mexican–American War. Later in life, he was elected as a Los Angeles City councilman. The city of Pico Rivera was named to honor him as the last governor of California to be born in Mexico.

American period
In 1853, a company of Army Engineers, which included the geologist William P. Blake, passed by the mission in search of the best route for an intercontinental railroad. Blake observed that the once great vineyards had fallen into wild disarray. Fences were in disrepair and animals roamed freely through the property. But the mission bells were ringing and the church was still in use. Blake predicted, "I believe that when the adaptation of that portion of California to the culture of the grape and the manufacture of wine becomes known and appreciated, the state will become celebrated not only for its gold and grain, but (also) for its fruits and wines."

In the first United States census made in California in 1860, 586 people lived in the San Gabriel township, an area encompassing the mission lands and several adjacent ranchos stretching north to what is now Pasadena.  By 1870, the population had shrunk to 436.

San Gabriel incorporated as a city April 24, 1913, with a population of 1,500.

Geography

The city is located in the San Gabriel Valley and is bordered on the north by San Marino, on the east by Temple City and Rosemead, to the south by Rosemead and to the west by Alhambra.

Parks

The Parks and Recreation Department offers an after school sports program and a summer playground program for San Gabriel youth. Along with these programs, the Department provides a variety of trips and special events throughout the year for youth of all ages.

Parks include:
Adult Recreation Center and Senior Center, 324 South Mission Drive
Bovard-Wilson-Hayes House and Jail
Grapevine Park and Arbor, 324 South Mission Drive
Smith Park and Pool, 232 West Broadway,
Vincent Lugo Park, Corner of Wells and Ramona Streets

Climate
According to the Köppen Climate Classification system, San Gabriel has a hot-summer Mediterranean climate, abbreviated "Csa" on climate maps. Summers are hot and very dry, and winters are mild.

Demographics

2010

The 2010 United States Census reported that San Gabriel had a population of 39,718. The racial makeup of San Gabriel was 24,091 (60.7%) Asian, 10,076 (25.4%) White (11.4% Non-Hispanic White), 388 (1.0%) African American, 220 (0.6%) Native American, 43 (0.1%) Pacific Islander, 3,762 (9.5%) from other races, and 1,138 (2.9%) from two or more races. Hispanic or Latino of any race were 10,189 persons (25.7%).

The Census reported that 39,266 people (98.9% of the population) lived in households, 34 (0.1%) lived in non-institutionalized group quarters, and 418 (1.1%) were institutionalized.

There were 12,542 households, out of which 4,542 (36.2%) had children under the age of 18 living in them, 6,668 (53.2%) were opposite-sex married couples living together, 1,961 (15.6%) had a female householder with no husband present, 965 (7.7%) had a male householder with no wife present.  There were 481 (3.8%) unmarried opposite-sex partnerships, and 76 (0.6%) same-sex married couples or partnerships. 2,121 households (16.9%) were made up of individuals, and 800 (6.4%) had someone living alone who was 65 years of age or older. The average household size was 3.13.  There were 9,594 families (76.5% of all households); the average family size was 3.47.

The population was spread out, with 7,866 people (19.8%) under the age of 18, 3,555 people (9.0%) aged 18 to 24, 11,335 people (28.5%) aged 25 to 44, 11,388 people (28.7%) aged 45 to 64, and 5,574 people (14.0%) who were 65 years of age or older.  The median age was 40.3 years. For every 100 females, there were 93.2 males.  For every 100 females age 18 and over, there were 90.6 males.

The homeowner vacancy rate was 1.0%; the rental vacancy rate was 5.7%.  19,974 people (50.3% of the population) lived in owner-occupied housing units and 19,292 people (48.6%) lived in rental housing units.

2000

As of the census of 2000, there were 39,804 people, 12,587 households, and 9,566 families residing in the city. The population density was 9,639.3 inhabitants per square mile (3,721.2/km2). The racial makeup of the city was 33.40% White, 1.06% African American, 0.83% Native American, 48.91% Asian, 0.10% Pacific Islander, 12.36% from other races, and 3.34% from two or more races. Those identifying as Hispanic or Latino (of any race) were 30.71% of the population.

There were 12,587 households, out of which 35.7% had children under the age of 18 living with them, 54.1% were married couples living together, 15.2% had a female householder with no husband present, and 24.0% were non-families. 18.2% of all households were made up of individuals, and 6.4% had someone living alone who was 65 years of age or older.  The average household size was 3.10 and the average family size was 3.52.

In the city, the population was spread out, with 23.5% under the age of 18, 8.6% from 18 to 24, 33.3% from 25 to 44, 21.1% from 45 to 64, and 13.4% who were 65 years of age or older.  The median age was 36 years. For every 100 females, there were 92.2 males.  For every 100 females age 18 and over, there were 88.5 males.

The median income for a household in the city was $56,720, and the median income The per capita income for the city was $24,816.  About 9.5% of families and 12.9% of the population were below the poverty line, including 17.4% of those under age 18 and 9.5% of those age 65 or over.

Economy

Top employers

According to the city's 2019 Comprehensive Annual Financial Report, the top employers in the city are:

Government

In the state legislature San Gabriel is located in the 21st Senate District, represented by Democrat Anthony Portantino, and in the 49th Assembly District, represented by Democrat Ed Chau.

City
Five Councilmembers are elected by the voters to serve a four-year term. The Mayor is appointed annually by the Council in a rotation among its members. The City Council is also the Redevelopment Agency Board of Directors. The current members are  Tony Ding (D), John R. Harrington (L), Denise Menchaca (D), Carina Rivera, and John Wu.

The city's first Chinese American mayor was Chi Mui in 2006. He symbolized San Gabriel's rise as the new center of the region's Chinese community. He died of cancer three months later. Mui was replaced by Albert Y. M. Huang, who served as mayor during his term. Huang submitted his resignation October 19, 2010 following a late-night domestic dispute with his girlfriend and subsequent arrest. Huang has since been cleared of all charges.

Education

The city of San Gabriel is served by the San Gabriel Unified School District. The 2009 API school reports has recognized the San Gabriel Unified school district as one of the top school districts in California. Gabrielino High School consistently ranks with some of the highest scores possible among public high schools in California. All five of the public elementary schools in San Gabriel have been honored as a California Distinguished School. Jefferson Middle School is also recognized as a California Distinguished School.

Two elementary schools that exist within the city limits are operated by the Garvey School District, in the southern portion of San Gabriel.

Gabrielino High School has been named by U.S. News & World Report as one of "America's Best Public High Schools". Del Mar High School, which opened in 2010, is an alternative high school. San Gabriel High School is located in the Alhambra Unified School District.

San Gabriel Mission High School is a Catholic, all girls school.

Media
San Gabriel community news are covered by the San Gabriel Valley Tribune, a paid daily newspaper, as well as by Mid-Valley News and San Gabriel Sun, which are community weeklies.

Culture

The city has a mixture of Asian, European, and North American cultures. Second- and third-generation Chinese Americans patronize its diverse array of stores and eateries.

There is the  "San Gabriel Square" mall, sometimes referred to as the "Chinese Disneyland". It was also nicknamed by the Los Angeles Times as "the great mall of China." This stretch of Chinese shops and bold architecture, with roofs of Spanish-style tile, is the model for the new ethnoburbs recently recognized in places like Las Vegas and Houston.

Transportation

San Gabriel is currently served by the Los Angeles County Metropolitan Transportation Authority.

In 2008, voters approved the measure, proposition 1A for the California High Speed Rail Project from San Diego to San Francisco. The project will be constructed in two segments. The San Francisco to Los Angeles/Anaheim project is scheduled to be built first, at a cost of $43 billion, with a completion date in 2029. The second phase of the proposed railway, from Los Angeles to stations in San Diego will not begin construction until after phase one is completed. The California High-Speed Rail Authority is responsible for planning, designing, and building the system.

Conceptually, the voters were very enthusiastic about a high speed railway. The reality of the possibility that it could impact their neighborhood and their homes is being met with steadfast disapproval.  When the California High-Speed Rail Authority recently met with the city councils and residents of San Gabriel, El Monte, Rosemead and Alhambra, to discuss the four proposed routes for phase two, the members of the three city councils expressed that residents were very concerned that the railway could possibly end up in their backyards.  Mayor David Gutierrez said  "We made a promise to the community that the city of San Gabriel will never allow anything like this to happen if there is any consideration that people might lose their home." No decisions will be made until environmental impact and evaluation of the various proposed routes are completed in 2014.

Notable people 
Rick Aguilera, Major League Baseball pitcher, was born in San Gabriel
Hank Aguirre, Major League Baseball pitcher
Susan Atkins, convicted murderer, associate of Charles Manson
Judge Roy Bean, notorious Wild West figure
Jesse Chavez, Major League Baseball pitcher
Francisco Dumetz, missionary
Mike Garcia, Major League Baseball pitcher
Curly Howard, comedian and actor
Ward Kimball, animator for Disney
Mike Krukow, Major League Baseball pitcher and TV commentator
Billy Laughlin, child actor
Dee Luong, poker player
Gary McCord, pro golfer and TV commentator
Angela Morales, writer
Bill Mumy, actor
Danny Patterson, Major League Baseball pitcher
General George S. Patton, World War II general
Pio Pico, last Mexican Governor of California
Luis J. Rodriguez, poet and writer
Allan Sandage, astronomer
 Tex Schramm, original general manager of the Dallas Cowboys; born in San Gabriel
Laurence Trimble, silent film actor
Louis Vitale, priest and peace activist
Kurt Vollers, pro football player
Joanna Wang, singer-songwriter

Sister cities
 Changhua City (Changhua County, Taiwan) - (since 1986)

See also

Chinese enclaves in the San Gabriel Valley

References

External links

 
Cities in Los Angeles County, California
Communities in the San Gabriel Valley
Incorporated cities and towns in California
Populated places established in 1771
1771 establishments in Alta California
Spanish mission settlements in North America